Fotbal Club Argeș 1953 Pitești was a Romanian football club from Pitești, Argeș. It was founded in 2013 as a phoenix club of the then-dissolved team FC Argeș Pitești, and was fully owned by its supporters.

History

Liga IV Argeș County (2014–present)
After the dissolution of the original team FC Argeș Pitești, the supporters recreated the team and named it FC Argeș 1953, a phoenix club who started in Liga IV. In their first season they finished on the second place in Liga IV – Argeș County. In the same year they participated in the first ever Football without Owners Tournament, a new established trophy for the fan-owned phoenix clubs in Romania, the other participants was ASU Politehnica Timișoara, FC Vaslui 2002 and the host LSS Voința Sibiu, they finished on the third place at the event. On June 12, they managed to win against the county rivals Unirea Bascov to win the league and qualify in the promotion play-off to Liga III.

After the promotion the club was dissolved, not having enough financial support.

Honours

Domestic
Liga IV – Argeș County
Winners (1): 2015–16
Runners-up (1): 2014–15

Friendly
Football without Owners Tournament
Third place (1): 2015

Statistics

References

External links
Official website 

Fan-owned football clubs
Association football clubs established in 2013
Association football clubs disestablished in 2016
Defunct football clubs in Romania
Football clubs in Argeș County
2013 establishments in Romania
2016 disestablishments in Romania
Liga IV clubs